The Battle of Grijó (10–11 May 1809) was a battle that ended in victory for the Anglo-Portuguese Army commanded by Lieutenant-General Sir Arthur Wellesley (the future 1st Duke of Wellington) over the French army commanded by Marshal Nicolas Soult during  the second French invasion of Portugal in the Peninsular War.  The next day, Wellesley drove Soult from Porto in the Second Battle of Porto.

Background
The Second Portuguese campaign started with the Battle of Braga.

Battle
On 10 May British Cavalry under the command of General Sir Stapleton Cotton came into contact with outlying French Forces, after a short engagement they were scatted, both sides only suffering light casualties, but many French prisoners were taken.

The following day, on the 10th, a larger force commanded by General Julien Augustin Joseph Mermet defended the forested ridge, south of Grijo. the Anglo-allied forces under the command of Sir Arthur Wellesley (later Duke of Wellington) attacked them from the south, using a double flanking manoeuvre to threaten and drive them back.

In "The History of the Rifle Brigade", Willoughby Verner describes how the ad hoc 1st Battalion of Detachments, made from soldiers and officers of multiple regiments who had become stranded with the evacuation of Coruna, fought for the first time near the village of Grijó (Vila Nova de Gaia):

The infantry of the advance guard consisted of the Rifle Company of the 1st Battalion of Detachments, the Companies of the 43rd and 52nd Light Infantry and the Light Company of the 29th Regiment of Foot, the whole under the command of Major Way of the 29th. Cotton with the British Cavalry came in touch with the French at dawn on the 10th, but [Major-General] Michel Francheschi  had some infantry with him and Stewart's Brigade was delayed and did not come for some time; Francheschi thereupon fell back and joined [General] Mermet at Grijó. On the 11th Wellesley ordered [Major-General] Hill to endeavour to outflank Mermet's position on the east whilst he with [Major-General] Paget's Division advanced. In the afternoon the Light Companies of the 1st Battalion of Detachments attacked Mermet but met with a stiff resistance and lost not a few. Wellesley now ordered the King's German Legion to turn the French left and the 16th Portuguese to turn their right and with the rest of Stewart's Brigade renewed the attack on the wooded heights in the centre above the village of Grijó. Mermet thereupon withdrew...

Aftermath
The Second Portuguese campaign proceeded with the Second Battle of Porto.

Explanatory notes

Notes

References

Further reading

External links
 

Battle of Grijó
Battles of the Peninsular War
Battles involving Portugal
Battles involving the United Kingdom
Battle of Grijó
May 1809 events
Arthur Wellesley, 1st Duke of Wellington